Fazl-e-Haq Khairabadi (1796/1797 – 19 August 1861) was a Hanafi jurist, rationalist scholar, Maturidi theologian, philosopher and poet. He was an activist of the Indian independence movement and campaigned against British occupation. He issued an early religious edict in favour of doing military jihad against British colonialism during 1857 and inspired various others to participate in the 1857 rebellion. He wrote Taḥqīqulfatvá fī ibt̤āl al-t̤ug̲h̲vá in refutation of  Ismail Dehlvi's Taqwiyat al-Imān and authored books such as al-S̲aurah al-Hindiyah.

Life
Fazl-e-Haq was born into a family of Indian Muslims. He was born in 1796 or 1797 in Khairabad, Sitapur. His father was sadr-ul-sadur, the chief advisor to the Mughals regarding religious matters. He became a teacher by the age of 13. In 1828, he was appointed to the position of mufti in the Department of Qaza.

Besides being a scholar of Islamic studies and theology, he was also a literary persona, especially of Urdu, Arabic and Persian literature. More than 4,00 couplets in Arabic are attributed to him. He edited the first diwan of Mirza Ghalib on his request. He followed the Hanafi school of thought and was a theologian of the Maturidi school. He was also a poet.

He had a phenomenal memory and memorized the Qur'an in a little over four months. He has also completed the curriculum in Arabic, Persian and religious studies by the age of thirteen.

On account of his deep knowledge and erudition, he was called "Allama" and later was venerated as a great Sufi. He was also bestowed with the title imam hikmat and kalaam (The imam of logic, philosophy and literature). He was considered by scholars, the final authority on issuing fatwas or religious rulings.

He possessed a great presence of mind and was very witty. There are many stories about his repartee with Mirza Ghalib and other contemporary eminent poets, writers and intellectuals. He and his son Abdul al-Haq Khairabadi established Madrasa Khairabad in northern India, where many scholars got educated. He wrote Risala-e-Sauratul Hindia in Arabic language and wrote an account of the rebellion called As-Saurat al Hindiya.

Fatwas against Wahhabi/ Deobandi theories
Khairabadi, in his career, had written various Masnavis against Wahhabis. In 1825, Khairabadi issued fatwas against Ismail Dehlvi for his doctrine of God's alleged ability to lie (Imkan-e-Kizb). Ismail is considered as an intellectual ancestor of Deobandis. Darul Uloom Deoband, founder Rashid Ahmad Gangohi later accepted Dehlvi's doctrines of Imkan e kizb by stating that God has the ability to lie. This doctrine is called Imkan-i Kizb. According to this doctrine, because God is omnipotent, God is capable of lying. Gangohi supported the doctrine that God has the ability to make additional prophets after Muhammad (Imkan-i Nazir) and other prophets equal to Muhammad.
 	
Allama Fazle Haq Khairabadi refuted these theories and wrote that, according to the Qur’an and Hadith, the prophet Muhammad is the final prophet, and there can be no other prophet or "messenger" after him. To believe that there can be another Muhammad would necessitate that Allah did something apart from what he has stated in the Qur’an, that is, that Allah has lied. Lying is a flaw and it is impossible for Allah to have a flaw. This reflects his deep insight into the political, social and religious environment which was emerging with the growing influence of Englishmen and at last capture of Delhi by them.

Jihad against British governance
As the Indians started to struggle against British occupation, Khairabadi conducted several private meetings with the Mughal emperor Bahadur Shah Zafar, which continued until May 1857. On June 26, 1857, when General Bakht Khan, along with his army of 14,000, reached Delhi from Bareilly, Khairabadi gave a Friday sermon, attended by a plethora of Muslim scholars and issued a religious edict supporting jihad against the colonial government. The fatwa was signed by Sadruddin Aazurda, Abdul Qadir, Faizullah Dehelvi, Faiz Ahmed Badayuni, Wazir Khan, and Syed Mubarak Shah Rampuri. Through this edict, he inspired people to participate in 1857 rebellion. Subsequently, the Britishers deployed an army of some 90,000 around Delhi to protect its interests and to curb spread of jihad, following the issuance of Khairabadi's edict. Later, he was sent into exile to Kalapani jail in the Andaman and Nicobar Islands.

He was arrested by the British authorities on January 30, 1859, at Khairabad for inciting violence. He was tried and found guilty of encouraging murder and role in the 'jihad'. The authorities considered him "extraordinary intelligence and acumen who should be reckoned as the most dangerous threat to the British presence in India, and therefore must be evicted from the Indian main soil. He was accused of being the major force behind the mutiny, persuading masses to rise in revolt against the authority of the Company, campaigning and motivating masses to join the mutiny by calling it war of independence and Issuing Fatwas, inciting violence and making instigating speeches.

He had chosen to be his own counsel and defended himself utilising arguments and a manner in which he defended his case that was so convincing that the presiding magistrate was writing a judgement to exonerate him, when he confessed to giving the fatwa, declaring that he could not lie. He was sentenced to life in prison in Kalapani (Cellular Jail) on Andaman Island, and his property was confiscated by the judicial commissioner of Awadh court. He reached Andaman Island on October 8th, 1859 aboard the steam frigate "Fire Queen". He would remain imprisoned there until his death in 1861.
One of the major reason for the outbreak of war was the fear among the people that the Christian British government was going to destroy their religion and convert Indians to Christianity.

Literary works
Khairabadi wrote Taḥqīqulfatvá fī ibt̤āl al-t̤ug̲h̲vá refuting Ismail Dehlvi's Taqwiyat al-Imān. His other works include:
 al-H̲adiyat al-saʻīdīya
 Alroẓ al-majūd : masʼlah-yi vaḥdat al-vajūd kī buland pāyah tak̲h̲līq
 al-Ḥāshiyah lil-Mawlawī Faḍlḥaq al-Khayrābādī ʻalá Sharḥ al-Sallam lil-Qāḍī Mubārak
 al-S̲aurah al-Hindiyah

Personal life
He was Farooqui (a descendant of 'Umar ibn al-Khattab). His father was Imam Fazl-e-Iman. One of his sons, Abdul Haque, was also a leading and respected scholar and was given the title of Shamsul Ulema. His grandson was Muztar Khairabadi. Renowned poet and lyricist Jan Nisar Akhtar was his great-grandson and Javed Akhtar, Farhan Akhtar and Zoya Akhtar all are his descendants.

Among his sons, Abdul Haq Khairabadi was a rational scholar and a teacher of Majid Ali Jaunpuri.

Death
He stayed for 22 months in captivity at Andaman, Allama wrote a number of eyewitness accounts in the form of verses in Arabic (Qaseeda), apart from a book Alsoorat-ul- Hindia which is a critical analysis of the war and events of 1857. This is also the first ever book on the events of 1857.  
Fazl-e-Haq Khairabadi died on August 19, 1861, in exile on the Andaman Islands.

Notes

See also
Islam in India
Shah Abdur Rahim
Shah Waliullah Dehlawi
Muntakhib al-Haqq
Ahmadullah Shah

References

Further reading
 
 
 

19th-century Muslim scholars of Islam
Indian Sufi religious leaders
Sunni Sufis
Indian Sufis
1797 births
1861 deaths
Indian people who died in prison custody
Prisoners and detainees of British India
Revolutionaries of the Indian Rebellion of 1857
19th-century Indian judges
Indian independence activists from Uttar Pradesh
Indian Sunni Muslim scholars of Islam
Hanafis
Maturidis
People from Sitapur district